Hezekiah Lord Hosmer (born Hudson, New York, December 10, 1814; died San Francisco, California, October 31, 1893) was a lawyer, judge, journalist, and author.

Biography
Hosmer was born into a prominent family. His grandfather Titus Hosmer signed the Articles of Confederation for Connecticut; his uncle Stephen Hosmer was chief justice of the Connecticut Supreme Court; and his father, Hezekiah Lord Hosmer, was a U. S. Representative from New York who died six months before Hosmer's birth.

Hosmer started studying law in Cleveland, Ohio at the age of 16. At 22 he moved west to the Maumee Valley of Ohio. From 1848 to 1854 he was the editor of the Toledo Blade newspaper. After serving as secretary to the Committee of Territories of the U. S. House of Representatives, Hosmer was appointed first chief justice of the Montana Territory Supreme Court in 1864 by President Abraham Lincoln, serving until 1868. From 1869 to 1872 he was the postmaster in Virginia City. He then moved to San Francisco, California, where he had obtained a position in the Customs House, and remained there until his death.

Hosmer was active in Freemasonry for most of his life. While in Toledo he was Master of a lodge and held offices on the state level, serving as Deputy Grand Master of the Grand Lodge of Ohio. In Montana he was the first Master of Montana Lodge #2 and served several terms as the Grand Secretary of the Montana Grand Lodge. At his death he had for ten years been the Grand Prelate of the Grand Commandery of California.

Hosmer was one of the original incorporators of the Montana Historical Society and was its first Historian.

Works 
Hosmer authored a number of works on various subjects: a history, Early History of the Maumee Valley (1858); an anti-slavery novel, Adela, the Octoroon (1860); and Bacon and Shakespeare in the Sonnets (1887).

Family 
He was married four times: to Sarah E. Seward (died July 8, 1839), Jane Eliza Thompson (died March 4, 1848; their only child, Richard Alsop Hosmer, died April 16, 1848 aged less than six months), and Mary Daniels (Stower) b. July 8, 1818 in Abergavenny, Monmouth, Wales (sister of New York Supreme Court Justice Charles Daniels), married Sept. 12, 1849, with whom he had three children. His son John Allen Hosmer (1850–1907) self-published a travel narrative A Trip to the States, By Way of the Yellowstone and Missouri in Virginia City in 1867; it was the first such book published in the Montana Territory. Hosmer's wife Mary died April 30, 1858 and is buried in Collingwood cemetery in Toledo, Ohio. In August 1864 in Philadelphia he married his fourth wife, Sallie Cotney (marriage license has it hand-written as Cottney), b. May 22, 1842, who survived him.

Hosmer is buried at the Cypress Lawn Memorial Park in Colma, California.

References

External links
 Hezekiah Hosmer
  Montana Vigilantes and the Origins of the 3-7-77
  Bacon and Shakespeare in the sonnets
 Adela, the octoroon

Montana Territory judges
1814 births
1893 deaths
Journalists from New York (state)
People from Hudson, New York
Baconian theory of Shakespeare authorship
Montana pioneers
19th-century American historians
19th-century American male writers
American male novelists
Novelists from New York (state)
19th-century American journalists
American Freemasons
Journalists from Montana
American male journalists
19th-century American novelists
People from Virginia City, Montana
Chief Justices of the Montana Supreme Court
American male non-fiction writers
Historians from New York (state)